The Central American banded gecko (Coleonyx mitratus) is a species of moderately-sized gecko in the genus Coleonyx, native to Central America and first identified by Wilhelm Peters in 1863. It is a member of the eyelid geckos.

Description 
Length (including tail) reaches 190mm, with the tail encompassing 50-54% of the total. As indicated by their name, these geckos have brown, black and yellow horizontal bands on their dorsal surfaces.

Biology
The Central American banded gecko is crepuscular and hides in a burrow in the soil during the day. It emerges at dusk to forage for insects. If threatened, like most geckos, it can lose its tail.  Most will regenerate lost tails within a year.

Distribution
These geckos are found from Guatemala south to Costa Rica.

In captivity
Central American banded geckos are popular as pets. A single Central American banded gecko can be housed in a 20-gallon terrarium.

See also
 Lizards of Laguna de Apoyo Nature Reserve, Nicaragua

References

Coleonyx
Reptiles of Central America
Reptiles described in 1863
Taxa named by Wilhelm Peters